The 1907 South Carolina Gamecocks football team represented the University of South Carolina as an independent during the 1907 college football season. Led by Douglas McKay in his first and only season as head coach, South Carolina compiled a record of 3–0. This remains the only unbeaten season in program history.

Schedule

References

South Carolina
South Carolina Gamecocks football seasons
College football undefeated seasons
South Carolina Gamecocks football